The 2021 Combined Japan Cup was held from 18 to 19 June 2021 in Morioka city, Iwate Prefecture. It was organized by the JMSCA (Japan Mountaineering and Sport Climbing Association). The athletes competed in combined format of two disciplines of bouldering and lead, simulating the 2024 Paris Olympics format. The winner for men was Tomoa Narasaki and for women was Akiyo Noguchi.

Schedule

Competition format 
It was held to simulate the 2024 Paris Olympics format. Eight competitors with the highest scores proceeded to the finals.

Scoring

Bouldering

Lead

Men

Qualifications

Finals

Women

Qualifications

Finals

References

Climbing Japan Cup
2021 in sport climbing